Wythenshawe Community Farm is an educational farm based in Wythenshawe Park, South Manchester. Although set in an urban environment, it operates as a working countryside farm. It was founded by Leslie Howard, a teacher, and was established in 1984 in Sharston, before moving to Wythenshawe Park. The farm is a registered charity, and it is open all days of the week. The farm has a wide selection of farm animals including pigs, sheep, goats, cows and horses, and it often has baby animals on site due to its breeding programme. Its herd of Hereford cattle has won prizes. The farm's walled garden, located behind the farm, used to supply fruit and vegetables to Wythenshawe Hall.

References 

City farms in England
Wythenshawe